Lotus halophilus is a species of annual herb in the family Fabaceae. They have a self-supporting growth form and compound, broad leaves.

Sources

References 

halophilus
Flora of Malta